Shoji Kikuchi (born 13 July 1944) is a Japanese professional golfer.

Kikuchi played on the Japan Golf Tour, winning once.

Professional wins (1)

Japan Golf Tour wins (1)

External links

Japanese male golfers
Japan Golf Tour golfers
Sportspeople from Shizuoka Prefecture
1944 births
Living people